Jason Keller (born December 12, 1968, Indianapolis, Indiana) is an American playwright and screenwriter. He has also been credited under the anagram pen name of Arnell Jesko. Keller is a New Harmony Writing Fellowship recipient, a two time Bronx New Voices nominee, a Satellite Award nominee for Best Original Screenplay, an Oglethorpe Award nominee and the recipient of an IFJA Hoosier Award.

Keller's father is former major league pitcher Ron Keller, who played for the Minnesota Twins.

Career
Keller went on to write Tarsem Singh's film Mirror Mirror, starring Julia Roberts, as well as Mikael Håfström's 2013 action film Escape Plan, starring Arnold Schwarzenegger and Sylvester Stallone. He is also the executive producer of the fifth movie in the Die Hard franchise, A Good Day to Die Hard, starring Bruce Willis.
 
With co-writer Eric Pfeffinger, Keller wrote The Paladin which he is producing with David Dobkin and Academy Award Nominated producer Robbie Brenner. The Paladin is based on a novel by Brian Garfield and tells the true story of how the British government orchestrated a monumental shift in World War 2 through a top-secret program which turned a 15 year old boy into one of England’s deadliest assassins. Tye Sheridan is attached to play the leading role. 
 
Most recently, Keller wrote Ford v. Ferrari, the movie directed by James Mangold and starring Matt Damon and Christian Bale. The movie was released in November, 2019 by 20th Century Fox. The movie was nominated for four Academy Awards, including a Best Picture nomination.
 
In June 2015 it was reported that Keller’s 2006 Black List script "A Willing Patriot"  was bought by Open Road Films and is expected to go into production in 2020 with Martin Zandvliet (“Land of Mine”) directing and Liam Neeson starring.

In 2011, it was announced that Keller would collaborate with director Matt Reeves on the adaptation of the Justin Cronin novel The Passage with Ridley Scott producing.

Filmography
 Big Shot: Confessions of a Campus Bookie (2002)
 Machine Gun Preacher (2011)
 Mirror Mirror (2012)
 Escape Plan (2013) (using the pen name Arnell Jesko)
 Ford v Ferrari (2019)
 Mulan (Sony Pictures upcoming movie)

References

External links

Living people
1968 births
20th-century American dramatists and playwrights
American male screenwriters
Ball State University alumni
Writers from Indianapolis
American male dramatists and playwrights
20th-century American male writers
Screenwriters from Indiana